The City of Brussels (  or alternatively Bruxelles-Ville ;   or Brussel-Stad) is the largest municipality and historical centre of the Brussels-Capital Region, as well as the capital of the Flemish Region (from which it is separate) and Belgium. The City of Brussels is also the administrative centre of the European Union, as it hosts a number of principal EU institutions in its European Quarter.

Besides the central historic town located within the Pentagon, the City of Brussels covers some of the city's immediate outskirts within the greater Brussels-Capital Region, namely Haren, Laeken, and Neder-Over-Heembeek to the north, as well as the Avenue Louise/Louizalaan and the Bois de la Cambre/Ter Kamerenbos park to the south-east, where it borders municipalities in Flanders.

, the City of Brussels had a total population of 176,545. As of 2007, there were approximately 50,000 registered non-Belgians in the City of Brussels. In common with all of Brussels' municipalities, it is legally bilingual (French–Dutch).

Territorial history

Historically, the City of Brussels was simply defined, being the area within the second walls of Brussels, the modern-day Small Ring (Brussels' inner ring road). As the city grew, the surrounding villages grew as well, eventually growing into a contiguous city, though the local governments retained control of their respective areas.

The construction of the Avenue Louise/Louizalaan was commissioned in 1847 as a monumental avenue bordered by chestnut trees that would allow easy access to the popular recreational area of the Bois de la Cambre/Ter Kamerenbos. However, fierce resistance to the project was put up by the town of Ixelles (which was then still separate from Brussels) through whose land the avenue was supposed to run. After years of fruitless negotiations, Brussels finally annexed the narrow band of land needed for the avenue plus the Bois de la Cambre itself in 1864. That decision accounts for the unusual southeastern protrusion of the City of Brussels and for Ixelles being split in two separate parts. Part of the Université libre de Bruxelles (ULB)'s Solbosch campus is also part of the City of Brussels, partially accounting for the bulge in the southeast end.

Unlike most of the municipalities in Belgium, the ones located in the Brussels-Capital Region were not merged with others during mergers occurring in 1964, 1970, and 1975. However, a few neighbouring municipalities have been merged into the City of Brussels, including Haren, Laeken and Neder-Over-Heembeek in 1921. These comprise the northern bulge in the municipality. To the south-east is also a strip of land along the Avenue Louise that was annexed from Ixelles.

Quarters

Pentagon

Central Quarter
It is in the heart of Saint-Géry/Sint-Goriks Island, formed by the Senne river, and on which a first keep was built around 979, that the origin of Brussels is located. Today, the neighbourhood around the /, a former covered market, is one of the trendiest districts of the capital. In this Central Quarter, there are some vestiges of the 13th-century first walls of Brussels, which surrounded the area between the first port on the Senne, the old Romanesque church (later replaced by the Brabantine Gothic Cathedral of St. Michael and St. Gudula), and the former ducal palace of Coudenberg in today's Royal Quarter. In the centre of this triangle are the Grand-Place/Grote Markt (Brussels' main square); the Îlot Sacré district, which takes its name from its resistance to demolition projects, itself crossed by the Royal Saint-Hubert Galleries; the / district, which welcomed the pilgrims on their way to Santiago de Compostela; as well as the former Brussels Stock Exchange building, built on the site of a former Franciscan convent, whose remains have been uncovered.

Royal Quarter
The Royal Quarter is thus named because it houses, on the one hand, the Place Royale/Koningsplein ("Royal Square" or "King's Square"), built under Charles-Alexander of Lorraine on the Coudenberg hill, on the site of the former Palace of the Dukes of Brabant, of which certain levels of foundation still exist, and on the other hand, the Royal Palace of Brussels, which faces Brussels Park, on the other side of which is the Belgian House of Parliament (Palace of the Nation). Below the Royal District is the Central Station and the Mont des Arts/Kunstberg where the Royal Library of Belgium (KBR), the Royal Belgian Film Archive (Cinematek), the Brussels Centre for Fine Arts, the Museum of Cinema, the Musical Instruments Museum (MIM), the BELvue Museum, and the Royal Museums of Fine Arts of Belgium are located.

Sablon/Zavel Quarter

From the Place Royale/Koningsplein, the / crosses the Sablon/Zavel Quarter, made of the larger / ("Large Sablon") square in the north-west and the smaller / ("Small Sablon") square and garden in the south-east, divided by the Church of Our Blessed Lady of the Sablon. It is a swanky quarter, where an antiques market is held, and in which antique and art dealers, as well as other luxury shops, have their businesses. Not far from there stood the Art Nouveau Maison du Peuple/Volkshuis by the famous architect Victor Horta, until its demolition in 1965. The Sablon is also home to the Egmont Palace and the Royal Conservatory of Brussels.

Marolles/Marollen Quarter

In the shadow of the gigantic Palace of Justice lies the old Marolles/Marollen Quarter (not to be confused with the Marolle that purists delimit to only seven streets). From the / to the Place du Jeu de Balle/Vossenplein, where a daily flea market known as the Old Market has been held since 1873, along the / and the /, second-hand and popular shops have for some years given way to antique shops, marking a profound change to the neighbourhood. The Cité Hellemans, a remarkable example of early 20th-century collective housing complexes, was built on the site of the neighbourhood's many squalid cul-de-sacs. The Rue Haute, one of the longest and oldest streets in the city, follows the course of an old Gallo-Roman road, and runs along Saint Peter's Hospital, built in 1935 on the site of a lepers' hospital, to end at the Halle Gate, the only survivor of the series of gates which allowed passage inside the second walls of Brussels.

Midi–Lemonnier or Stalingrad Quarter
It is in the heart of the Midi–Lemonnier Quarter, where the Place Rouppe/Rouppeplein is today, that Brussels' first South Station—called Bogards' railway station for the eponymous convent whose site it was built on, and to which the / is nowadays the only reference—was located from 1839, the terminus of the South Line. The former presence of a station at this location also explains the unusual width of the current /, which goes from the square to the Small Ring, cleared of its railways since the inauguration of Brussels-South Station, built outside the Pentagon in 1869. Because of this, the neighbourhood is sometimes called the Stalingrad Quarter. At the same time, following the covering of the Senne, the neighbourhood saw the construction of Haussmann-esque grand central boulevards, including the /, bordered by the Place Fontainas/Fontainasplein and the Place Anneessens/Anneessensplein (former location of the Old Market), as well as by the Midi Palace. Each Sunday morning, the Midi district hosts the second largest market in Europe.

Senne/Zenne or Dansaert Quarter
The damp and swampy grounds around the present-day / and / were occupied by craftsmen since the Middle Ages. An arm of the river crossed the defences of the second walls at the level of the Ninove Gate and the / ("Small Lock"), which served as a port, an end of which remaining there until the 1960s. Later, small industries and many artisan breweries (now disappeared) established themselves in the area, which is still evident by the names of the / ("Hops Street") and the / ("Old Grain Market Street"). The Shot Tower (Tour à Plomb), which was used for the manufacture of lead shot for hunting, and the / ("Gunpowder Street"), also testify to the neighbourhood's former activities. Long neglected as a result of the relocation of businesses outside the city centre, the Senne/Zenne Quarter has for a few years been the object of a new interest and is undergoing gentrification due to the many disused industrial premises being converted into lofts. The area around the / has become a trendy district and is attracting a younger, more well-off, and mostly Dutch-speaking population. This new situation, which has the consequence of rising rents, is not without problems for the less fortunate inhabitants of the neighbourhood.

Quays or Maritime Quarter
The Quays Quarter is that of the old Port of Brussels, which played for a long time the role of "belly" of the city. The boats coming from the Scheldt river penetrated through the former Rivage Gate, at the site of present-day /, to join one of the canals, whose docks were each reserved for one type of goods. Filled in the 19th century, at the opening of Brussels' new port, the canals were replaced by wide boulevards, the two sides of which retain in their names the memory of their former function: the / ("Brick Wharf"), the / ("Firewood Wharf"), the / ("Quarry Stone Wharf"), the / ("Hay Wharf"), etc., or references to the neighbourhood's commercial activities: the / ("Warehouse Street"), the / ("Traders Street"), the / ("Pig Market Street") and the / ("Trade Wharf"). Along the quaysides, numerous bourgeois houses, once belonging to wealthy merchants, have preserved the entrances to the warehouses. On the /, one can still cross food wholesalers, supplied nowadays by trucks, which have replaced the boats. The neighbourhood also includes the beguinage of Brussels, with the Church of St. John the Baptist and the remarkable Grand Hospice Pachéco.

Marais–Jacqmain Quarter
Few of the buildings in the Marais–Jacqmain Quarter have escaped 20th-century demolition, from the / to the Rue Neuve/Nieuwstraat. They have been replaced by the State Administrative City, press printers, banking facilities, and commercial galleries. The current trend is to restore the neighbourhood's social mix by redeveloping former office buildings into housing. Despite the long-time grim aspect of the district, the Meyboom tradition has been maintained for centuries, and the former Art Nouveau Magasins Waucquez by Victor Horta have been preserved and house, since 1993, the Belgian Comic Strip Center. Another preserved islet is the 18th-century neoclassical Place des Martyrs/Martelaarsplein, which has gradually been renovated. The victims of the Belgian Revolution of 1830 are buried there in an open crypt with a memorial. The latter, a very busy square in the city centre, is dominated at its southern end by two block-style building towers, but for the rest, it has totally (Hotel Metropole and its neighbour the Hotel Atlanta) or partially (UGC cinema) preserved its old facades.

Freedom Quarter
The Freedom Quarter is situated between the Belgian Parliament and the Rue Royale/Koningsstraat, not far from the crossroads with the Small Ring, and has as its focal point the Congress Column, built in memory of the National Congress of 1830–31, the founder of democratic liberties in Belgium, under which also lies the tomb of the Unknown Soldier with an eternal flame. Not far from there is the Hotel Astoria, dating from 1911, which is currently being renovated and enlarged, and will be reopened in the coming years. In the 19th century, the district was known as / and was inhabited in majority by working-class people. The authorities' desire to clean up the squalid parts of the city led to the expulsion of the population and the neighbourhood's complete destruction. A new bourgeois district was developed during the last quarter of the century. The choice was made to commemorate Belgian Independence: the / ("Liberty Square"), the / ("Barricades' Square"), the / ("Revolution Street"), the / ("Congress Street"), etc. The four streets overlooking the Place de la Liberté bear the names of the four constitutional liberties, symbolised by the four allegorical bronze female sculptures surrounding the Congress Column: Freedom of the Press, Worship, Association and Education. This eclectic urban complex is one of the best preserved of the Pentagon today.

Eastern Quarters

European Quarter and Leopold Quarter

The European Quarter is located to the east of the Pentagon, around the Place du Luxembourg/Luxemburgplein and the Robert Schuman Roundabout, and includes the smaller Leopold Quarter. The European Parliament was built near the Place du Luxembourg, on the site of the former Leopold Quarter railway station, and of which only the central building overlooking the square remains, having been replaced by the underground Brussels-Luxembourg railway station. The European Commission, housed in the Berlaymont building, is located on the Schuman Roundabout, not far from the Cinquantenaire Park. Across the street stands the Justus Lipsius building and the Europa building (part of the Residence Palace), serving as the seat of the European Council and the Council of the EU. In Leopold Park, the House of European History (HEH) initiates visitors to the social history of the European continent. There is a visitor centre in the main European Parliament building, known as the Parliamentarium, and another smaller one in the Justus Lipsius building for the European Council. It is accessible on certain days, by appointment. Many of the attractions in the European Quarter are free to visit.

Squares Quarter
The Squares Quarter is the northern spur of the European Quarter, located between Saint-Josse-ten-Noode and the Leopold Quarter. The district is bounded by the / to the north, the / and the / to the east, the / and the / to the south, as well as the Small Ring to the west. The toponym refers to the many squares in the area, in particular the /, the /, the / and the /. The area between the Small Ring and the Square Marie-Louise is sometimes considered to be part of the Leopold Quarter.

Northern Quarters

Laeken
Laeken is a former municipality in the north of the Brussels-Capital Region, annexed by the City of Brussels in 1921. Laeken is home to, among others, the Royal Domain of Laeken, the Palace of Laeken, the Royal Greenhouses of Laeken (1873), the Church of Our Lady of Laeken (whose crypt contains the tombs of the Belgian Royal Family) and Laeken Cemetery, known for its wealth of monuments and sculptures. On the territory of Laeken also lies the Heysel/Heizel Plateau, where were held the World's Fairs of 1935 and 1958 and which includes the King Baudouin Stadium, Bruparck (with the Atomium, Mini-Europe miniature park and Kinepolis cinema), the Centenary Palace, home to the Brussels Exhibition Centre (Brussels Expo), and the Port of Brussels, next to which the Monument to Work by Constantin Meunier was erected. On its southern part, it holds the former Tour & Taxis industrial site, which was annexed to the City of Brussels in 1897, twenty-four years before the rest of the municipality.

Mutsaard
Sometimes also known as the Pagoda district, the Japanese Tower district or De Wand district, Mutsaard (also spelled Mutsaert), is an old hamlet and a historic district located between Laeken and Neder-over-Heembeek and centred around the /. The district was part of the former municipality of Laeken (postcode: 1020) but also a piece of Neder-over-Heembeek, annexed by Laeken in 1897. It is separated from the rest of Laeken by the Royal Domain and is the site of the Museums of the Far East. The district also extends a little on the neighbouring Flemish municipalities of Vilvoorde and Grimbergen.

Neder-Over-Heembeek
Neder-Over-Heembeek is a former municipality incorporated in the City of Brussels in 1921, at the same time as Laeken and Haren. It has the distinction of having the oldest place name in the Brussels-Capital Region, as it was mentioned in an ordinance as early as the 7th century. This is where the Queen Astrid Military Hospital, which is the National Burns and Poisons Centre, as well as recruitment services of the Belgian Armed Forces are located.

Haren
Like Laeken and Neder-Over-Heembeek, the former municipality of Haren was annexed by the municipality (City) of Brussels in 1921, which allowed the extension of the Schaerbeek railway station north of its territory. But it is the presence, southwest of the town, of an airfield, created by the Germans during the First World War, and where the Belgian national airline Sabena was born, which precipitated the annexation of Haren. For almost fifty years, Haren has been home to NATO's headquarters. It is also the location of many other administrations and companies, such as the headquarters of Eurocontrol.

Demographics
Migrant communities in the City of Brussels with over 1,000 people as of 1 January 2020:

Politics

As in every other Belgian municipality, the City of Brussels is headed by a mayor, who should not be confused with the Minister-President of the Brussels-Capital Region or the Governor of Brussels-Capital. The current city council was elected in the October 2018 elections. The current mayor of the City of Brussels is Philippe Close a member of PS, who is in coalition on the municipal council with Ecolo - Groen, DéFI and Forward.

Culture

Museums 

There are many museums in and around Brussels' city centre. On the first Sunday of every month, free entry is granted to many of Brussels' museums.
The Underwear Museum opened in 2009, and was initially in the City of Brussels. In 2016 it moved to Lessines, Hainaut, Wallonia.

Below is a non-exhaustive list of museums in the City of Brussels:

 Royal Museums of Art and History :
 Art & History Museum
 Horta-Lambeaux Pavilion
 Halle Gate
 Museums of the Far East
 Musical Instruments Museum
 Royal Museums of Fine Arts of Belgium :
 Oldmasters Museum
 Magritte Museum
 Fin-de-Siècle Museum
 Wiertz Museum
 Meunier Museum
 Royal Museum of Modern Art
 Royal Museum of the Armed Forces and Military History

Food
Brussels is well known for its food. Brussels sprouts were named after the city. Like most of Belgium, moules-frites, waffles (gaufres), chocolate, French fries, and beer are common there. It is home to one 2-starred and four 1-starred Michelin restaurants.

Honorary citizens
Among the recipients of the honorary citizenship of the City of Brussels are:

Heraldry

Vexillology

See also
 Transport in Brussels
 Timeline of Brussels
 Bourgeois of Brussels
 Seven Noble Houses of Brussels
 Guilds of Brussels

References

Footnotes

Notes

Bibliography

External links

 Official website 
 Official tourism website 
 Webcam Grand-Place Brussels
 Interactive map

 
City of Brussels
Municipalities of the Brussels-Capital Region
Populated places in Belgium
Capitals in Europe